International Literacy Day is an international observance, celebrated each year on 8 September, that was declared by UNESCO on 26 October 1966 at the 14th session of UNESCO's General Conference. It was  celebrated for the first time in 1967. Its aim is to highlight the importance of literacy to individuals, communities and societies. Celebrations take place in several countries.

Rationale 
Some 775 million lack minimum literacy skills; one in five adults are still not literate and two-thirds of them are women; 60.7 million children are out-of-school and many more attend irregularly or drop out. According to UNESCO’s "Global Monitoring Report on Education for All (2006)", South Asia has the lowest regional adult literacy rate (58.6%), followed by sub-Saharan Africa (59.7%). Countries with the lowest literacy rates in the world are Burkina Faso (12.8%), Niger (14.4%) and Mali (19%). The report shows a clear connection between illiteracy and countries in severe poverty, and between illiteracy and prejudice against women.

Celebrations 

Celebrations of International Literacy Day have included specific themes, in line with Education For All goals and other United Nations programs such as the United Nations Literacy Decade. The celebration's theme for 2007 and 2008 was “Literacy and Health”, with prizes awarded to organizations at the forefront of health education. This was also the thematic emphasis of the 2007–2008 biennium of the United Nations Literacy Decade. In particular, International Literacy Day 2008 had a strong emphasis on Literacy and Epidemics with a focus on communicable diseases such as HIV, tuberculosis and malaria, some of the world's forefront public health concerns. For 2009–2010 the emphasis was placed on “Literacy and Empowerment”, with special consideration to gender equality and the empowerment of women. The theme of the 2011–2012 celebrations is “Literacy and Peace”. The theme of 2022 is Transforming Literacy Learning Spaces to reconsider the basic significance of literacy learning spaces for fostering resilience and guaranteeing high-quality, equitable, and inclusive education for all.

The following writers are supporting UNESCO through the Writers for Literacy Initiative: Margaret Atwood, Paul Auster, Philippe Claudel, Paulo Coelho, Philippe Delerm, Fatou Diome, Chahdortt Djavann, Nadine Gordimer, Amitav Ghosh, Marc Levy, Alberto Manguel, Anna Moi, Scott Momaday, Toni Morrison, Érik Orsenna, Gisèle Pineau, El Tayeb Salih, Francisco Jose Sionil, Wole Soyinka, Amy Tan, Miklós Vámos, Abdourahman Waberi, Wei Wei, Banana Yoshimoto. Not only the writers contribute to raising awareness to the problem of illiteracy: along with the writers’ engagement, there are various companies and charity organizations that support the fight against illiteracy. Some supporters of International Literacy Day include the Global Development Research Center, Montblanc, the National Institute for Literacy, and Rotary International.

See also 
 Literacy
 List of countries by literacy rate
 UNESCO Confucius Prize for Literacy
 UNESCO King Sejong Literacy Prize
 United Nations Literacy Decade

References

External links 
 
 UN Page
 UNESCO's Literacy Portal
 UNESCO Effective Literacy Practice Database

Literacy Day, International
Literacy
September observances
Literacy Day, International